Lyle Saxon (18911946) was a writer and journalist who reported for The Times-Picayune in New Orleans, Louisiana. He directed the Federal Writers' Project Works Progress Administration (WPA) guide to Louisiana.

Life
Saxon was born on September 4, 1891, either in Baton Rouge, Louisiana, or in New Whatcom, Washington, now incorporated into Bellingham, Washington, while his mother was traveling away from home; the early history of his life is "as evasive as the histories that frustrated Saxon in writing Old Louisiana". The confusion is based on Saxon's alleging he was born in Baton Rouge, but his birth certificate states New Whatcom, Washington. It is possible that his parents, from distinguished families with connections to Baton Rouge and New Orleans, were unmarried, although the birth certificate lists the birth as "legitimate"; Saxon said little about his background and early years, and never met his father. He was raised, however, in Baton Rouge, and made frequent trips to New Orleans throughout his early life, where his paternal uncle and grandmother lived.

Saxon moved to New Orleans not long after college in 1914 or 1915 and, after moving again several times, settled there permanently in 1918. Saxon lived in the French Quarter at 612 Royal St. starting in 1918; Sherwood Anderson, William Faulkner, Roark Bradford, and Edmund Wilson visited.

He was an ardent student of the history of New Orleans and wrote six books on the subject.  His most popular titles include Fabulous New Orleans, recounting the city's past as set against his memories of his first Mardi Gras during the turn of the 20th century; Gumbo Ya-Ya, a compilation of native folk stories from Louisiana, including the Loup Garou and the LaLaurie House; and Old Louisiana, a local bestseller from its introduction in 1929.

Saxon was an enthusiastic participant in the New Orleans Mardi Gras tradition.

Saxon's fiction included short stories: "Cane River" was published in The Dial magazine edited by Marianne Moore, and "The Centaur Plays Croquet" included in the American Caravan anthology in 1927. Saxon's 1930 novel Lafitte the Pirate was the basis for the 1938 Cecil B. DeMille film The Buccaneer. His 1937 novel Children of Strangers sold well.

He was a director to the Federal Writers' Project, WPA guide to Louisiana.

He is buried at Magnolia Cemetery (Baton Rouge, Louisiana).

Legacy

Contemporary historians of the city rely heavily on Saxon's works for reference. In 1986, M.A. Houston wrote a master's thesis titled "The Shadow of Africa on the Cane: An Examination of Africanisms in the Fiction of Lyle Saxon and Ada Jack Carver." Ada Jack Carver Snell of Minden, Louisiana, was another Louisiana author who wrote about the Cane River country of her native Natchitoches Parish.

Bibliography

  reprint 2006
  reprint 1988
  reprint 1989
   reprint 1989
  reprint 1989
 reprint 1987

References

External links

1891 births
1946 deaths
American newspaper reporters and correspondents
20th-century American novelists
Novelists from Louisiana
American male novelists
American folklorists
Burials at Magnolia Cemetery (Baton Rouge, Louisiana)
20th-century American male writers
20th-century American non-fiction writers
American male non-fiction writers